Sir Robert Edward Jones (born 24 November 1939) is a property investor, author and former politician in New Zealand. During the course of various political campaigns, he has developed a reputation for making highly controversial off-the cuff remarks.

Biography
Jones was born in Lower Hutt on 24 November 1939, the son of Edward L. Jones. He is the older brother of author Lloyd Jones.

Growing up in a Lower Hutt state housing suburb, Jones attended Naenae College from 1953 to 1957. He was one of the 200 foundation pupils, and one of the ten who stayed to the sixth form (most pupils left as soon as they turned 15 to work) where he recalled a brilliant history teacher, Guy Bliss. He went on to attend Victoria University of Wellington, where he earned a blue in boxing, won the New Zealand Universities lightweight boxing title in 1957, and contributed to a boxing column in the university's newspaper Salient. He remained a fan of boxing and sometimes commented on TV on big matches.

Jones earned his wealth through investments in commercial property via his company Robt. Jones Holdings Ltd, and was worth $550 million according to the 2013 NBR rich list, and $600 million a year later.

Jones formed the short-lived libertarian New Zealand Party in 1983, just before Robert Muldoon's snap 1984 election. Jones explicitly stated his disgust that the supposedly pro-free-enterprise New Zealand National Party had implemented socialist policies like price and wage freezes, and a top tax rate of 66%. His party acted as a spoiler, helping to deliver the government to the New Zealand Labour Party. Then the party implemented free market reforms under Finance Minister Roger Douglas (hence Rogernomics). When the election was over, Jones disbanded the party, seeing that Labour had implemented many of his policies. He and Muldoon had a legal feud, where Muldoon unsuccessfully sued Jones for defamation. But Jones had great respect for Muldoon in other areas. Jones even chaired the farewell dinner on the occasion of Muldoon's retirement from Parliament.

In the 1984 election Jones stood for the Ohariu seat, held by cabinet minister Hugh Templeton.  Templeton distributed a speech to journalists, which included the statement "Mr Jones despises... bureaucrats, civil servants, politicians, women, Jews and professionals...". Jones successfully sued Templeton for defamation.  Templeton conceded the comment Jones despised Jews was untrue, but claimed to have a number of defences such as qualified privilege; all were rejected by the court, which found in Jones favour.  Templeton v Jones became an important precedent in defamation law.   

In 1985, Jones was located by reporters in a helicopter while out fishing in a remote valley in Taupo. Jones, incensed at the intrusion when the helicopter landed on the adjacent bank, famously punched TVNZ reporter Rod Vaughan, with the whole incident recorded on tape. Jones was convicted of four charges of assault and fined $1,000. Jones asked the judge if he could pay $2,000 to do it again.

Jones attempted to remove the Fijian Embassy from one of his properties during the time of the 1987 Fijian coup and succeeded two years later.

In 2015, Jones was removed from an Air New Zealand flight by security staff for failing to follow crew instructions. Jones' company subsequently bought a jet for Jones and other company executives to use for NZ travel.

In 2018 Jones sued filmmaker Renae Maihi for defamation after she presented a petition to NZ Parliament calling for his knighthood to be revoked. The petition had garnered more than 90,000 signatures but was not accepted for consideration. The petition objected to comments Jones had written for the National Business Review. In one of Jones' newspaper columns, Jones suggested that the country's national holiday Waitangi Day, should be replaced by a Maori Gratitude Day, a suggestion he claimed was satirical.  The defamation trial began in February 2020 and was due to last 2 weeks. Ultimately, Jones withdrew the case after five days.

Honours
Jones was appointed a Knight Bachelor in the 1989 Queen's Birthday Honours, for services to business management and the community.

Bibliography

Novels
  The Permit (1984)
  Full Circle (2000)
  Ogg (2002)
  True Facts (2003)
  Degrees for Everyone (2004)
  Four Comic Novellas (2020)

Essay collections
 Wimp Walloping (1989)
 Prancing Pavonine Charlatans (1990)
 Punch Lines (1991)
 A Year of It (1992)
 Wowser Whacking (1993)
 No Punches Pulled The Best of Bob Jones (2014)

Non fiction
 New Zealand's Boxing Yearbook (1972 and 1973)
 Jones on Property (1977)
 New Zealand the Way I Want It (1978)
 Travelling (1980)
 Letters (1982)
 '80s Letters (1990)
 Prosperity Denied (1996)
 Memories of Muldoon (1997)
 My Property World (2005)
 Jones on Management (2007)
 Fighting Talk: Boxing and the Modern Lexicon (2013)

References

External links
 Bob Jones, centre, in 1979 (photo) 
 Robt. Jones Holdings Ltd website
 Random House author profile

1939 births
Living people
Leaders of political parties in New Zealand
New Zealand Knights Bachelor
People from Lower Hutt
Victoria University of Wellington alumni
Unsuccessful candidates in the 1984 New Zealand general election
People educated at Naenae College
New Zealand Party politicians
New Zealand libertarians
Businesspeople awarded knighthoods
20th-century New Zealand businesspeople
21st-century New Zealand businesspeople